Karaca (roe deer in Turkish) may refer to:


People

Surname
Kamer Karaca (born 1978), American/Armenian Diamond Setter/Musician
  (born 1990), Turkish athletics competitor; see Athletics at the 2017 Islamic Solidarity Games – Results
 Cem Karaca (1945–2004), Turkish musician and son of Toto Karaca
 Efecan Karaca (born 1989), Turkish footballer
 , Turkish journalist
 Gizem Karaca (born 1992), Turkish actress and model
  (born 1922), Turkish businessperson and environmentalist, and 2012 winner of the Right Livelihood Award
 Hidayet Karaca (born 1963), Turkish journalist
 Işın Karaca (born 1973), Turkish singer
 Kâni Karaca (1930–2004), Turkish singer
 Mehmet Karaca (born 1957), rector of Istanbul Technical University (ITU)
 Toto Karaca (1912–1992), Turkish stage actress and mother of Rem Karaca
 Yasin Karaca (born 1983), Turkish footballer

Places
 Karaca, Çat
 Karaca Cave, a network of caves near Torul, Turkey
 Karaca Dağ, a volcano in eastern Turkey
 Karaca Island, an Aegean island of Turkey
 Karaca, Çorum

See also
 Karacalar (disambiguation), various places
 Karacaören (disambiguation), various places
 

Turkish-language surnames